2019 is the third year in the history of Legacy Fighting Alliance, a mixed martial arts promotion based in the United States.

Event list

Legacy Fighting Alliance 57: Zalal vs. Mariscal

Legacy Fighting Alliance 57: Zalal vs. Mariscal was the fifty-eighth event of Legacy Fighting Alliance and took place on January 18, 2019. It aired on AXS TV.
 
Results

Legacy Fighting Alliance 58: Park vs. Willis

Legacy Fighting Alliance 58: Park vs. Willis was the fifty-ninth event of Legacy Fighting Alliance and took place on January 25, 2019. It aired on AXS TV.
 
Results

Legacy Fighting Alliance 59: Michaud vs. Aguilera

Legacy Fighting Alliance 59: Michaud vs. Aguilera was the sixtieth event of Legacy Fighting Alliance and took place on February 1, 2019. It aired on AXS TV.
 
Results

Legacy Fighting Alliance 60: Anglickas vs. York

Legacy Fighting Alliance 60: Anglickas vs. York was the sixty-first event of Legacy Fighting Alliance and took place on February 15, 2019. It aired on AXS TV.

Results

Legacy Fighting Alliance 61: Allen vs. Murrietta

Legacy Fighting Alliance 61: Allen vs. Murrietta was the sixty-second event of Legacy Fighting Alliance and took place on February 22, 2019. It aired on AXS TV.

Results

Legacy Fighting Alliance 62: Kenney vs. Cachero

Legacy Fighting Alliance 62: Kenney vs. Cachero was the sixty-third event of Legacy Fighting Alliance and took place on March 22, 2019. It aired on AXS TV.

Results

Legacy Fighting Alliance 63: Krantz vs. Patterson

Legacy Fighting Alliance 63: Krantz vs. Patterson was the sixty-fourth event of Legacy Fighting Alliance and took place on March 29, 2019. It aired on AXS TV.

Results

Legacy Fighting Alliance 64: Park vs. Jackson

Legacy Fighting Alliance 64: Park vs. Jackson was the sixty-fifth event of Legacy Fighting Alliance and took place on April 26, 2019. It aired on AXS TV.

Results

Legacy Fighting Alliance 65: Royval vs. Sanchez

Legacy Fighting Alliance 65: Royval vs. Sanchez was the sixty-sixth event of Legacy Fighting Alliance and took place on May 3, 2019. It aired on AXS TV.

Results

Legacy Fighting Alliance 66: Diamond vs. Neal

Legacy Fighting Alliance 66: Diamond vs. Neal was the sixty-seventh event of Legacy Fighting Alliance and took place on May 10, 2019. It aired on AXS TV.

Results

Legacy Fighting Alliance 67: James vs. Martin

Legacy Fighting Alliance 67: James vs. Martin was the sixty-eighth event of Legacy Fighting Alliance and took place on May 24, 2019. It aired on AXS TV.

Results

Legacy Fighting Alliance 68: Jennerman vs. Barbosa

Legacy Fighting Alliance 68: Jennerman vs. Barbosa was the sixty-ninth event of Legacy Fighting Alliance and took place on May 31, 2019. It aired on AXS TV.

Results

Legacy Fighting Alliance 69: Pérez vs. Moreno

Legacy Fighting Alliance 69: Pérez vs. Moreno was the seventieth event of Legacy Fighting Alliance and took place on June 7, 2019. It aired on AXS TV.

Results

Legacy Fighting Alliance 70: Ferreira vs. Martin

Legacy Fighting Alliance 70: Ferreira vs. Martin was the seventy-first event of Legacy Fighting Alliance and took place on June 28, 2019. It aired on AXS TV.

Results

Legacy Fighting Alliance 71: Jackson vs. Souza

Legacy Fighting Alliance 71: Jackson vs. Souza was the seventy-second event of Legacy Fighting Alliance and took place on July 12, 2019. It aired on AXS TV.

Results

Legacy Fighting Alliance 72: Madrid vs. Harris

Legacy Fighting Alliance 72: Madrid vs. Harris was the seventy-third event of Legacy Fighting Alliance and took place on July 26, 2019. It aired on AXS TV.

Results

Legacy Fighting Alliance 73: Lingo vs. Hatley Jr.

Legacy Fighting Alliance 73: Lingo vs. Hatley Jr. was the seventy-fourth event of Legacy Fighting Alliance and took place on August 2, 2019. It aired on AXS TV.

Results

Legacy Fighting Alliance 74: Vanderaa vs. Ferreira

Legacy Fighting Alliance 74: Vanderaa vs. Ferreira was the seventy-fifth event of Legacy Fighting Alliance and took place on August 30, 2019. It aired on AXS TV.

Results

Legacy Fighting Alliance 75: Neal vs. Cruz

Legacy Fighting Alliance 75: Neal vs. Cruz was the seventy-sixth event of Legacy Fighting Alliance and took place on September 6, 2019. It aired on AXS TV.

Results

Legacy Fighting Alliance 76: Ogden vs. Browne

Legacy Fighting Alliance 76: Ogden vs. Browne was the seventy-seventh event of Legacy Fighting Alliance and took place on September 13, 2019. It aired on AXS TV. The event also marked the end of LFA's deal with AXS TV as a acquisition of majority interest by Anthem Sports & Entertainment.

Results

Legacy Fighting Alliance 77: James vs. Martin

Legacy Fighting Alliance 77: James vs. Martin was the seventy-eighth event of Legacy Fighting Alliance and took place on September 27, 2019.

Results

Legacy Fighting Alliance 78: Yanez vs. Estrada

Legacy Fighting Alliance 78: Yanez vs. Estrada was the seventy-ninth event of Legacy Fighting Alliance and took place on November 15, 2019. It aired on UFC Fight Pass. The event also marked the beginning of LFA's deal with UFC Fight Pass.

Results

Legacy Fighting Alliance 79: Royval vs. Williams

Legacy Fighting Alliance 79: Royval vs. Williams was the eightieth event of Legacy Fighting Alliance and took place on November 22, 2019. It aired on UFC Fight Pass.

Results

References

External links
  Legacy Fighting Alliance Official website

Legacy Fighting Alliance
2019 in mixed martial arts